"No Longer Slaves" is a song by Bethel Music featuring Jonathan David & Melissa Helser and it was released on August 21, 2015, as Bethel Music's lead single from their seventh live album, We Will Not Be Shaken (2015). The song also appeared on the album Bethel Music en Español (2019). The song won the "Worship Song of the Year" award at the 47th Annual GMA Dove Awards in 2016, with Jonathan David & Melissa Helser performing it at the ceremony.

Background
Composed by Jonathan Helser, Joel Case and Brian Johnson, a live version of the song was released as part of the Bethel Music compilation, We Will Not Be Shaken, on January 26, 2015. The live version was recorded on a mountaintop overlooking Shasta Lake in northern California, with Jonathan David & Melissa Helser leading the song.

The studio version of the song impacted Christian radio on August 21, 2015, as well as being distributed as a digital download, and was produced by award-winning producer Ed Cash.

Music videos
The live music video of the song was released by the Bethel Music on January 26, 2015, having been recorded at Shasta Lake and is part of the concert film We Will Not Be Shaken directed by Nathan Grubbs and Luke Manwaring. The live video was later released on February 17, 2015, on Bethel Music's YouTube channel, with over 7 million views as of May 2017.

The official lyric video of the song was released on January 26, 2015, also on Bethel Music's YouTube channel and has been viewed over 102 million times as June 2019.

Accolades
In August 2016, the Gospel Music Association announced the nominees of the 47th Annual GMA Dove Awards with "No Longer Slaves" being nominated for a Dove Award in the "Worship Song of the Year" category. On October 11, 2016, the song won the GMA Dove Award at a ceremony held at the Allen Arena on the campus of Lipscomb University in Nashville, Tennessee, with Jonathan David & Melissa Helser performing the song that night.

Charts

Certifications

Release history

References

2015 songs
2015 singles
Bethel Music songs